Nassir Maachi (born 9 September 1985) is a Dutch footballer who plays for De Posthoorn. He also works as a youth coach for the club.

Club career
Maachi began his career as a youth player at Utrecht. He made his first team debut during the 2005–06 season and spent the following year on loan with Dordrecht. He joined Cambuur in 2008 and spent three seasons with the club before being transferred to Zwolle, initially on loan and then permanently during the summer of 2011. In summer 2012, Maachi joined technical director Kevin Hofland at Cypriot side AEK Larnaca. After an unsuccessful stint in Albania, Maachi moved to Birkirkara in January 2015. In the next two years he played in Cyprus for Pafos FC and Nea Salamina. On 18 June 2016, the newly promoted to Greek Super League club Apollon Smyrni officially announced the signing of the experienced Dutch-Moroccan forward on a free transfer. At the end of August 2018, Maachi joined VV DOVO which competes in the Derde Divisie. At the end of 2018 he left there again to return to Cyprus.

At the end of November 2019, Maachi returned to his former youth club, SV Huizen, where he also would work as a youth coach. He began playing for De Posthoorn in 2021.

References

External links
 Player profile - Birkirkara
 VI Profile
 Nassir Maachi Interview

1985 births
Living people
People from Naarden
Dutch sportspeople of Moroccan descent
Dutch footballers
Dutch expatriate sportspeople in Cyprus
FC Utrecht players
FC Dordrecht players
SC Cambuur players
PEC Zwolle players
AEK Larnaca FC players
Flamurtari Vlorë players
Birkirkara F.C. players
Pafos FC players
Nea Salamis Famagusta FC players
Apollon Smyrnis F.C. players
Alki Oroklini players
VV DOVO players
ASIL Lysi players
Maltese Premier League players
Eerste Divisie players
Eredivisie players
Cypriot First Division players
Cypriot Second Division players
Super League Greece players
Dutch expatriate footballers
Expatriate footballers in Cyprus
Expatriate footballers in Malta
Expatriate footballers in Greece
Association football forwards
SV Huizen players
Footballers from North Holland
Dutch expatriate sportspeople in Greece
Dutch expatriate sportspeople in Malta
Dutch expatriate sportspeople in Albania
Expatriate footballers in Albania